The 1958 Ohio Bobcats football team was an American football team that represented Ohio University in the Mid-American Conference (MAC) during the 1958 NCAA University Division football season. In their first season under head coach Bill Hess, the Bobcats compiled a 5–4 record (2–4 against MAC opponents), finished in a tie for fourth place in the MAC, and outscored all opponents by a combined total of 159 to 102.  They played their home games in Peden Stadium in Athens, Ohio.

Schedule

References

Ohio
Ohio Bobcats football seasons
Ohio Bobcats football